Battery Rodgers was a gun emplacement that composed a portion of the American Civil War defenses of the American capital city of Washington, D.C.

Construction
Built in 1863, Battery Rodgers was constructed with the ability to interdict sea traffic sailing up the Potomac River to Washington, D.C.. The battery was named for George W. Rodgers, a captain in the Union Navy who was killed during an attack on Fort Wagner.

During the war, the battery mounted one  Parrott rifle and one  Rodman gun, one of the largest guns in the world at that time. 
The guns were supplied by two adjacent powder magazines, and the battery complex included a hospital, barracks, mess hall, and prison.  
It was garrisoned by 6 commissioned officers, 1 ordnance sergeant, and 256 men. Following the conclusion of the war, the Battery was disbanded and its guns were removed to other locations in Washington. The land on which the battery rested was sold soon afterward, due in no small part to its location in the center of Alexandria, Virginia.

Today, no portion of the battery still stands, but it is memorialized by a small marker in Alexandria, at the intersection of South Lee Street and Green Street and the corner of Jones Point Park. The Rodman gun used at the battery was moved across the Potomac to Fort Foote, and can still be seen there today.

Notes

References

External links

 Alexandria Archeology, Battery Rodgers 
 Battery Rodgers Marker – Historical Marker Database

Civil War defenses of Washington, D.C.
Forts in the District of Columbia
Buildings and structures in Alexandria, Virginia
1863 establishments in Virginia